Chilpancingo de los Bravo   is one of the 81 municipalities of Guerrero, in south-western Mexico. The municipal seat is Chilpancingo de los Bravo.

Geography
The municipality is within the Sierra Madre del Sur mountain range.

As of 2005, the municipality had a total population of 214,219.

Towns and villages
The municipality has 114 localities. The largest are as follows:

Administration

Municipal presidents

References

Municipalities of Guerrero
Chilpancingo
Sierra Madre del Sur